Dan Earl (born October 12, 1974) is an American college basketball coach, was introduced as the head coach of Chattanooga Mocs on April 1, 2022. He is originally from Medford Lakes, New Jersey and attended Shawnee High School in Medford, graduating in 1993. He was a 1993 Parade All-American and was named 1993 USA Today New Jersey Player of the Year in high school. He was named 2nd team All-Big Ten as a junior for the 1995–96 Penn State Nittany Lions before losing two seasons to injury. He completed his eligibility for the team in 1999 and led Penn State basketball in assists four seasons.

He is the older brother of Cornell head coach Brian Earl.

Playing career

High school
During his high school basketball career he was named a Parade All-American. The Shawnee basketball team had a combined 59–3 record during Earl's junior and senior years. In 1991–92, his junior year, Shawnee was the New Jersey Group IV state champion, ranked #1 in New Jersey and #9 in the entire United States. In 1992–93 they were the South Jersey champion and was ranked #7 nationally. Earl was named the USA Today New Jersey Player of the Year in 1993 and his 2,006 career points total ranked him as first in scoring passing Darrin severs 1,996 points of Medford vo-tech  Burlington County's all-time leading scorer at the time of his graduation.

College
Earl accepted a scholarship to Penn State University where he was the starting point guard on the basketball team all four years. He is one of Penn State's all-time leaders in scoring and assists, and he was named to the All-Big Ten Conference second team by the media and third team by the coaches in 1996. He had an injury plagued college career that saw him redshirt twice and spend six years in the program. Earl led Penn State in assists four times. The 1995–96 Nittany Lions team started the season with a 19–2 record and was ranked #9 in the country at one point during the season.

Professional
Dan Earl played professionally in Germany, Poland, and Portugal. He also spent time in the Continental Basketball Association as well as the NBA Development League. He got close to making a National Basketball Association team, where in the 2001–02 and 2002–03 seasons he spent time with the New Jersey Nets during their training camps.

Coaching career
In 2006, Earl joined his alma mater as an assistant coach. He spent six seasons with the team until 2011, at which time he became the associate head coach at the United States Naval Academy.

In April 2015, Earl was hired as head coach at VMI, replacing Duggar Baucom.

On March 30, 2022, Earl accepted the head coaching position at Chattanooga.

Personal
Dan and his wife, Sheila, were married in the summer of 2008 and have two daughters, Mila and Alyssa. His brother Brian Earl is also an accomplished basketball player and is currently head coach at Cornell.

Head coaching record

References

External links
Naval Academy coach profile
NBA D-League stats @ basketball-reference.com

1975 births
Living people
American expatriate basketball people in Germany
American expatriate basketball people in Poland
American expatriate basketball people in Portugal
American men's basketball players
Basketball coaches from New Jersey
Basketball Löwen Braunschweig players
Basketball players from New Jersey
College men's basketball head coaches in the United States
Giessen 46ers players
Navy Midshipmen men's basketball coaches
Parade High School All-Americans (boys' basketball)
Penn State Nittany Lions basketball players
Penn State Nittany Lions basketball coaches
People from Medford Lakes, New Jersey
Point guards
Roanoke Dazzle players
Shawnee High School (New Jersey) alumni
Sportspeople from Burlington County, New Jersey
Stal Ostrów Wielkopolski players
VMI Keydets basketball coaches